The 1999–00 Turkish Ice Hockey Super League season was the eighth season of the Turkish Ice Hockey Super League, the top level of ice hockey in Turkey. Eight teams participated in the league.

Regular season

Playoffs

Semifinals 
 Büyükşehir Belediyesi Ankara Spor Kulübü - Bogazici PSK Istanbul 1:0
 İstanbul Paten Spor Kulübü - Gümüş Patenler 10:1

3rd place
 Bogazici PSK Istanbul - Gümüş Patenler 2:4

Final 
 İstanbul Paten Spor Kulübü - Büyükşehir Belediyesi Ankara Spor Kulübü 4:8

External links
 Season on hockeyarchives.info

TBHSL
Turkish Ice Hockey Super League seasons
TBSHL